You Were Made for Me may refer to:
 "You Were Made for Me" (Sam Cooke song), 1958
 "You Were Made for Me" (Freddie and the Dreamers song), 1963
 "You Were Made for Me" (Irene Cara song), 1984